Cosmo George Gordon, 3rd Duke of Gordon KT (27 April 1720 – 5 August 1752), styled Marquess of Huntly until 1728, was a Scottish peer.

Life
Gordon was the son of the 2nd Duke of Gordon and was named after his father's close Jacobite friend, Cosimo, Grand Duke of Tuscany. He sat in the House of Lords as a Scottish Representative Peer from 1747 to 1752. In 1748, he was made a Knight of the Thistle.

Family
Gordon married Lady Catherine Gordon (1718 – 10 December 1779), daughter of William, Earl of Aberdeen, on 3 September 1741. They had three sons and three daughters.

Alexander, 4th Duke of Gordon (1743–1827)
Lord William Gordon (1744–1823)
Lady Anne Gordon (16 Mar 1748 – 7 Jun 1816)
Lord George Gordon (1751–1793), after whom the Gordon Riots were named
Lady Susan Gordon (c. 1752 – 1814), married first John, Earl of Westmorland, and second, Colonel John Woodford, having issue from both marriages
Lady Catherine Gordon (26 Jan 1751 – 3 Jan 1797)

References

1720 births
1752 deaths
3
Knights of the Thistle
Scottish representative peers